Do Nothing 'Til You Hear From Me is a six-part BBC Radio 4 sitcom originally broadcast in 2004, written by British comic actor and writer Marcus Powell based on his Roy Diamond character. In the radio version, produced by Carol Smith, the cantankerous Jamaican stand-up comedian played by Powell was transformed into an equally cantankerous trombone player, Roy Walcott, played by Ram John Holder (of Desmond's and Porkpie fame). The supporting cast included Sam Kelly (Porridge) George Layton, Yvonne Brewster, Caroline Lee Johnson (Chef!) and Marcus himself playing Roy's long-suffering son-in-law Victor.

Guest stars included Gerald Harper,  Melvyn Hayes and Gemma Craven. The show was recorded at London's Drill Hall complete with live trombonist, and was co-written with The Stage′s Agony Uncle, John Byrne.

BBC Radio comedy programmes